Rajgram (code:RJG) is a small station located in the Rajgram panchayat of Birbhum district of West Bengal. It is the first station of WB, of the Sahibganj loop, located on the West Bengal–Jharkhand border. It is a small village that comes under Murarai I community development block.

References

Railway stations in Birbhum district
Howrah railway division